Glen Island is an island in Nunavut, Canada. 

Glen Island may also refer to:

 Glen Island (Thames), land between the head of the Jubilee River and the River Thames, England